Dipterocarpus alatus (Khmer: chhë tiël ba:y, chhë tiël tük, chhë tiël thom or ឈើទាល (chheutéal);), also known colloquially as the resin tree, is a tropical forest tree, of dense evergreen or mixed dense forests, in tropical Asia. It is considered vulnerable.

Description
Dipterocarpus alatus is a large tree, growing to between 30 and 60 m tall. It is insect pollinated, and sets fruit between March and April. Its seeds are wind dispersed.

Range and habitat
Dipterocarpus alatus ranges from West Bengal and Bangladesh through Myanmar, Thailand, Laos, Cambodia, and Vietnam, along with Peninsular Malaysia and the Philippines. It is also native to Sri Lanka and the Andaman Islands.

It grows in evergreen and semi-evergreen lowland dipterocarp forests in valleys and foothills. It is often found on ancient alluvial, granite, and basalt rock substrates. It requires humid and well-drained soil. It tolerates flooding but not fire or wind.

It often occurs gregariously along river banks and is a key planting species for regenerating deforested land around the Dong Nai river and Cat Tien National Park.

Uses
In Cambodia, the wood is much valued in construction and cabinetwork, when not exploited for its oily resin. Generally, resin is collected for the following uses: wood lacquering, draught-proofing of boats and traditional medicine. When mixed with beeswax, it is used in bandages for ulcerated wounds. The bark of young trees is also used in traditional medicine, taken against rheumatism and diseases of the liver, and to stimulate appetite in cattle.

In Myanmar, one of the largest of the species is in Kengtung, see photos.

References

External links

Dipterocarpus alatus, Koh Phangan, Thailand
In Vietnamese, illustrated

alatus
Flora of West Bengal
Flora of Bangladesh
Flora of Indo-China
Flora of Sri Lanka
Flora of the Andaman Islands
Flora of Peninsular Malaysia
Flora of the Philippines